Kolberg is a surname. Notable people with the surname include:

 Elmer Kolberg (1916–1994), American football playe
 Jaan Kolberg (born 1958), Estonian film director and producer
 Martin Kolberg (born 1949), Norwegian politician
 Oskar Kolberg (1814–1890), Polish ethnographer, folklorist, and composer

German-language surnames
Norwegian-language surnames